Moschochori is a village and a community of the Katerini municipality. Before the 2011 local government reform it was part of the municipality of Petra, of which it was a municipal district. The 2011 census recorded 516 inhabitants in the village.

References

Populated places in Pieria (regional unit)